Emperor Jingzong of Western Xia (1003–1048), born Li Yuanhao or Tuoba Yuanhao, also known as Zhao Yuanhao (趙元昊), Weiming Yuanhao (嵬名元昊) and Weiming Nangxiao (嵬名曩霄), was the founding emperor of the Western Xia dynasty of China, reigning from 1038 to 1048. He was the eldest son of the Tangut ruler Li Deming.

Early background 
Yuanhao was born to Tuoba Weiming's consort, lady Weimu as "Weimai" (嵬埋). After his father died in 1032, he became the leader of the Tangut.
He was described as a talented army general and had always wanted to establish a country for the Tanguts.

Military campaigns 

Early in his leadership, Jingzong abolished the surname Zhao which had been given by the Song dynasty, replacing it with the surname Weiming (Chinese: 嵬名,).

He had also started a revolution, changing the lifestyles of the Tangut people. He ordered Tangut men to shave their heads or they would face public execution. He also ordered a change of clothing and writing.

At its height, he claimed an army of 500,000 men.

In 1034 Jingzong attacked the Huanqing territories (環慶路). He captured Song general Qi Zongju (齊宗矩). 

At this point, he changed his target to the Kingdom of Qocho in the west, and his efforts against them began in 1036.

From the Uyghurs, he took large portions of Gansu, and the Tangut people would control the Hexi Corridor for 191 years before being conquered by the Yuan dynasty.

In 1038 he declared himself the emperor of the Western Xia dynasty whose capital was situated in Xingqing.  Afterwards, he launched a campaign against the Song. Although the Tangut empire won a series of three large battles, the victories proved to be very costly and they found their forces depleted, due in part to a scorched earth policy by the Song. In 1044 the Western Xia dynasty signed a treaty with the Song dynasty resulting in the nominal acknowledgment of Song sovereignty by the Tangut and the payment of tribute by the Song.

Culture and politics 

The Emperor led to a reorganization of much of the Empire with the help of ethnic Han advisors. The empire created new departments and administrative services. The Emperor also knew Chinese and had Chinese works translated into his people's language. He accomplished this by supporting the development of a written language for the Tangut people. 

However the Tangut script eventually went extinct after the Yuan conquest.

Nevertheless, Emperor Jingzong had strong opposition to the people imitating the Song dynasty too closely. He emphasized the value of their traditional nomadic way of life and discouraged any dependence on Song luxury items. Trade with the Song was minimized or cut off before the peace treaty that came four years before his death. Although Li used talented Song workers, to retain his own power and dynasty, he did not want to be conquered by the Song dynasty.

Later on the Western Xia emperors would switch between multiple sides, Liao, Song, Jin, and the Mongols, in order to retain their power. Li's attacks weakened the Jin and Song dynasties to the extent that the Mongols would later be able to conquer China. For vacillating between multiple sides, colluding with Mongols and Jurchen, and launching attacks against the Song.

However, the Mongols ultimately crushed the Western Xia dynasty, destroyed nearly any vestige of the empire, and ended Li's reign in Ningxia. The Mongols would then reunify China under the Yuan dynasty.

Succession and death 

In 1048, both the Prime Minister, Mozang Epang (沒藏訛龐), and Prince Ningling Ge (寧令哥) conspired to assassinate Jingzong. Prince Ningling Ge attempted to kill Jingzong with a sword, but he only managed to slice off Jingzong's nose. Frightened by what he had done, Prince Ningling Ge fled to Mozang for backup, but Mozang betrayed Ningling Ge by turning him in as the assassin.

Although Jingzong initially survived the assassination, he succumbed to his wounds a few days later.

Family 
Consorts and Issue:

 Empress Xiancheng, of the Yeli clan (憲成皇后野利氏; d. 1048)
 Ning Ming (寧明, d.1042), the Prince, second son
 Ningling Ge (寧令哥, 1032-1048), the Crown Prince, third son
 Xili (錫狸), fourth son
 Empress, of the Muoyi clan (新皇后沒移氏; d.1049)
 Empress Xuanmu Huiwen,of the Mozang clan (宣穆惠文皇后沒藏氏, d.1056)
Emperor Yizong of Western Xia, personal name Liangcha (兩岔) vel Liangzuo (諒祚), fifth son
 Princess Xingping, of the Khitan Yelü clan (興平公主耶律氏, d. 1038)
 Lady Suo (索氏)
 Lady Duola (多拉氏)
 Lady Mikemote (密克默特氏)
 Lady Miemi (咩迷氏)
Ali (阿哩, d.1045),  committed suicide together with his mother, second son

Unknown:
 Name not recorded, first son, killed by Li Yuanhao
 One daughter

Notes

References

External links 
 The Western Xia

1003 births
1048 deaths
Western Xia emperors
11th-century Chinese monarchs
11th-century Tangut rulers
Murdered Chinese emperors
Founding monarchs